Liangfeng High School (Chinese 梁丰中学) is located in Zhangjiagang, Jiangsu Province, China. It was founded in 1848. The school has modern teaching equipment. The school has a long history. It has more than 1500 students and 152 faculty.

High schools in Jiangsu